The 1951–52 European Rugby League Championship was played from September 1951 to April 1952 and featured six games in which the Wales, France, Other Nationalities and England rugby league teams each played each other once. This was the twelfth competition and was won for the fourth time by France

Results

Final standings

France win the tournament on point differential.

References

1951-52
1951 in rugby league
1952 in rugby league
1951 in English sport
1952 in English sport
1951 in French rugby league
1952 in French sport
1951-52
1951-52